Lucille Powers (November 18, 1911 – September 11, 1981) was an American actress who appeared in silent film and "talkies" in the 1920s and 1930s.

Powers went from South Carolina to Hollywood in 1928. During her first 18 months in film, she had only bit parts except for a featured role in Marquis Preferred.

Filmography 
 Three Weekends (1928)
 Marquis Preferred (1929)
 Untamed (1929) (uncredited)
 The Cossack's Bride (1929)
 King of Jazz (1930)
 Man to Man (1930)
 Two Gun Man (1931)
 A Private Scandal (1931)
 Amateur Daddy (1932)
 The Texas Bad Man (1932)
 The Mystic Hour (1934)
 Only Yesterday (1933)

References

External links
 

American silent film actresses
20th-century American actresses
Actresses from Texas
1911 births
1981 deaths